Louise Marwood (born 13 March 1979) is an English actress and comedian, known for portraying the role of Chrissie White in the ITV soap opera Emmerdale, which she played from 2014 until 2018.

Early life
Marwood was born on 13 March 1979 in Bristol, England as Louise Howells. She trained at the Oxford School of Drama.

Career

Early work
Acting under the name of Louise Howells, she appeared in various television programmes including Holby City, Doctors, The Royal, Waking the Dead, Hollyoaks, The Bill and Law & Order: UK. She also appeared as part of sketch show Comedy Bitch until 2010. In 2022, she made an appearance in the BBC One medical drama Casualty, and also joined the ITV soap opera Coronation Street, playing the recurring role of Camilla Perrin.

Emmerdale
On 4 October 2014, Marwood was cast in the role of Chrissie White in the ITV soap opera Emmerdale, the fiancée of established and returning character Robert Sugden, played by Ryan Hawley respectively. She was also introduced as part of a new Emmerdale fictional family, the White family. Chrissie arrived in the village with her fiancé Robert, her father Lawrence White (John Bowe) and her son Lachlan White (Thomas Atkinson). Marwood made a previously unannounced departure from Emmerdale on 11 January 2018, after her character was killed-off in a car accident. She appeared in 459 episodes.

Personal life
Marwood was born and raised in Bristol, England, under the name of Howells.

Filmography

References

External links

1979 births
Living people
English soap opera actresses
English television actresses
English film actresses
English comedians
Actresses from Bristol
21st-century English actresses